A web hosting control panel is a web-based interface provided by a web hosting service that allows users to manage their servers and hosted services.

Web hosting control panels usually include the following modules:
 Web server (e.g. Apache HTTP Server, Nginx, Internet Information Services)
 Domain Name System server
 Mail server and spam filter
 File Transfer Protocol server
 Database
 File manager
 System monitor
 Web log analysis software
 Firewall
 phpMyAdmin

See also
 Comparison of web hosting control panels

References 

Web server management software
Information technology consulting